This is a list of Jews from Sub-Saharan Africa. It is arranged by country of origin. The vast majority of African Jews inhabiting areas below the Sahara live in South Africa, and are mainly of Ashkenazi (largely Lithuanian) origin. A number of Beta Israel also reside in Ethiopia. Additionally, small post-colonial communities exist elsewhere.

Cameroon
 Yaphet Kotto, actor (Cameroonian father)

DR Congo
 Léon Kengo wa Dondo, Prime Minister of Zaire (Polish-Jewish father) 
 Moïse Katumbi, businessman and politician (Greek-Jewish father)
 Olivier Strelli, fashion designer

Ethiopia and Eritrea 

 Ephraim Isaac, Phd Princeton Scholar
 Adisu Massala, politician 
 Esti Mamo, Ethiopian-Israeli model
 Meskie Shibru-Sivan, actress and singer
 Yosef Ben-Jochannan, historian

Kenya
 Israel Somen, businessman and diplomat
 Jonathan Somen, entrepreneur
 Erica Mann, architect, town planner, NGO leader, women's cooperatives developer
 Igor Mann, veterinarian, senior civil service professional

Mozambique
 Albie Sachs, ANC activist (lived in Mozambique during exile from South Africa)
 Ruth First, ANC activist (lived in Mozambique during exile from South Africa)

Namibia
 Harold Pupkewitz, entrepreneur ( Lithuanian born)

South Africa

Politicians and activists

 Hilda Bernstein, anti-apartheid activist
 Lionel Bernstein, anti-apartheid activist
 Harry Bloom, anti-apartheid activist
 Jules Browde, barrister, jurist and anti-apartheid activist. Law school classmate of Nelson Mandela.
 Arthur Chaskalson, chief justice
 Abba Eban, Israeli diplomat (South African-born)
 Andrew Feinstein, former ANC MP, author & anti-arms trade activist 
 Bram Fischer, anti-apartheid activist
 Bernard Friedman, anti-apartheid MP
 Richard Goldstone, judge and international war crimes prosecutor
 Joel Joffe, human rights activist
 Ronnie Kasrils, former South African Intelligence Minister
 Tony Leon, former opposition leader
 Joe Slovo, ANC activist and leader of the South African Communist Party
 Harry Schwarz, anti-apartheid politician, lawyer and diplomat
 Helen Suzman, anti-apartheid MP
 Harold Hanson, QC and strong supporter of civil liberties

Other Jewish ANC activists included Ruth First, Albie Sachs and five of the six whites arrested in the Rivonia Trial: Denis Goldberg, Lionel Bernstein, Arthur Goldreich, James Kantor, Harold Wolpe and Gaby Shapiro.

Academics
 Abraham Manie Adelstein, UK Chief Medical Statistician
 Selig Percy Amoils, Inventor & Surgeon
 Moses Blackman, crystallographer
 Sydney Brenner, biologist, Nobel Prize (2002)
 Leo Camron, educationalist
 Sydney Cohen, pathologist (Jewish Year Book, 2005, p214, 230)
 Meyer Fortes, anthropologist
 Max Gluckman, anthropologist
 Frank Herbstein, crystallographer, 1926-2011
 Aaron Klug, chemist, Nobel Prize (1982)
 Ludwig Lachmann, economist
 Arnold Lazarus, psychologist
 Roland Levinsky, biologist
 Stanley Mandelstam, physicist (Jewish Year Book 2005 p214)
 Shula Marks, historian (Jewish Year Book 2005 p215)
 Frank Nabarro, physicist (Jewish Year Book 2005 p214)
 Seymour Papert, Artificial Intelligence pioneer
 Peter Sarnak, mathematician
 Isaac Schapera, anthropologist (Jewish Year Book 2005 p215)
 Anthony Segal, biochemist (Jewish Year Book 2005 p214)
 Joseph Sonnabend, HIV/AIDS researcher
 Phillip V. Tobias, palaeoanthropologist
 Joseph Wolpe, psychotherapist
 Lewis Wolpert, developmental biologist
 Basil Yamey, economist (Jewish Year Book 2005 p215,315)
 Solly Zuckerman, UK zoologist
 Max Price, Vice-Chancellor of the University of Cape Town

Cultural figures
 Lionel Abrahams, poet
 Jillian Becker, writer
 Dani Behr, TV presenter
 Harry Bloom, writer and lecturer
 Johnny Clegg, World Beat musician
 John Cranko, choreographer
Adam Friedland, comedian and podcaster
 Graeme Friedman, writer
 David Goldblatt, photographer
 Nadine Gordimer, writer, Nobel Prize (1991)
 Laurence Harvey, actor
 Ronald Harwood, playwright
 Manu Herbstein, writer
 Dan Jacobson, writer
 Sid James, comic actor
 Danny K, pop singer
 William Kentridge, artist
 Lennie Lee, artist
 Manfred Mann (Manfred Lubowitz), R&B keyboardist
 Sarah Millin, writer
 Trevor Rabin, guitarist & film composer
 Jonathan Shapiro (Zapiro), political cartoonist
 Antony Sher, stage actor
 Janet Suzman, stage actress

Business and professional figures
 Raymond Ackerman, supermarket tycoon
 Alfred Beit, diamond magnate
 Donald Gordon, founder of insurance company Liberty Life, shopping centre owner & philanthropist
 Sydney Jacobson, newspaper editor
 Solomon Joel, financier
 Sol Kerzner, hotel & casino owner
 Sammy Marks, early entrepreneur from Pretoria
 Ernest & Harry Oppenheimer, diamond tycoons & philanthropists (Harry converted to Christianity)
 Percy Yutar, South Africa's first Jewish attorney general and prosecutor of Nelson Mandela in the 1963 Rivonia Treason Trial.
Walter Matulis JR.  Co owner of a driver training business. Walter was raised as Roman Catholic only to find out in the 6th decade of his life that his ancestors were Lithuanian Jews. Walter remains a Christian while identifying himself as being of Jewish blood.

Sports figures
 Ali & Adam Bacher, cricketers
 Leo Camron, rugby union player and cricketer.
 Okey Geffin, rugby union player
 Harry Isaacs, Olympic boxing medalist
 Ilana Kloss, tennis player
 Sarah Poewe, swimmer
 Philip Rabinowitz (runner), 100-year-old sprinter
 Jeremy Reingold, World Champion Swimmer, Rugby Player
 Jody Scheckter, Formula 1 driver
 Shaun Tomson, surfer
 Mandy Yachad, cricketer

Rugby union
 Max Baise, South African rugby union referee.
 Louis Babrow
 Leo Camron, South African who helped introduce rugby to Israel., also a cricketer
 Okey Geffin, South African Rugby Union player
 Joe Kaminer
 Jonathan Kaplan, South African who holds the world record for refereeing the highest number of international rugby union test matches.
 Alan Menter, South African Rugby Union Player
 Cecil Moss, South African rugby union player and coach
 Sydney Nomis, South African Rugby Union player
 Wilf Rosenberg, rugby union player
 Fred Smollan
 Joel Stransky, South African rugby union player

Uganda
 Gershom Sizomu, rabbi

Zambia
 Denise Scott Brown, architect
 Stanley Fischer, IMF economist

Zimbabwe
 Norman Geras, professor of Government
 Anthony Gubbay, former chief justice
 Laurence Levy, pioneering neurosurgeon
 Alexander Pines, chemist
 Roy Welensky, prime minister of the Federation of Rhodesia and Nyasaland

See also
African Jews
List of Jews
List of African-American Jews
List of South Africans
Category:Black Jewish people

References

African Jews
Jews